The Autostrada A25 Torano–Pescara is a motorway which allows travel from Torano to Pescara in Italy. Along with the A24 it is also named the Autostrada dei Parchi (“Motorway of the Parks”). It runs from the A24 near Torano, past the Fucine Lake and Avezzano, through the Apennines and the valley of the river Aterno before joining the A14 after the Chieti exit. The A24 is 114 km in length with service stations, around 80 km apart, near each end.

This route like the A24 is currently managed by the Strada dei Parchi S.p.A..

Route

External links
Strada dei Parchi S.p.A. (in Italian)

A25
Transport in Abruzzo
Transport in Lazio